Huta  is a village in the administrative district of Gmina Rogowo, within Rypin County, Kuyavian-Pomeranian Voivodeship, in north-central Poland. Sarah Moon is the electoral mayor.

References

Huta